Edward Peter Lawless Faulks, Baron Faulks, KC (born 19 August 1950), is an English barrister and unaffiliated peer who is the current Chairman of the Independent Press Standards Organisation (IPSO). Formerly a Conservative peer, he was Minister of State for Justice between December 2013 and July 2016.

Background and education
Faulks is the son of Peter Ronald Faulks MC, a circuit judge, and Pamela Faulks (née Lawless). The novelist Sebastian Faulks is his younger brother. His uncle was Sir Neville Faulks, a High Court judge.

He was educated at Wellington College and Jesus College, Oxford, where he graduated with an MA and of which he is an honorary fellow.

Career 
Faulks was called to the Bar by the Middle Temple in 1973. He became a Queen's Counsel in 1996, an Assistant Recorder in 1996, and a Recorder in 2000. He became a Bencher of the Middle Temple in 2002.

Faulks was chairman of the Professional Negligence Bar Association from 2002 to 2004, special adviser to the Department for Constitutional Affairs on compensation culture from 2005 to 2006, and head of research for the Society of Conservative Lawyers from 2010 to 2012. He is a member of the Chartered Institute of Arbitrators. He was a literary agent at Curtis Brown from 1980 to 1981.

In 2010 he was created a life peer as Baron Faulks, of Donnington in the Royal County of Berkshire. In December 2013 it was announced that with effect from 20 January 2014 Faulks would become a Minister of State at the Ministry of Justice. He served in this role until July 2016, when he resigned from the government in protest against the appointment of Liz Truss as Secretary of State for Justice by new prime minister Theresa May.

Lord Faulks was appointed a Justice at the Astana International Financial Centre Court in Astana, Kazakhstan, in 2018.

Since January 2020, he has been Chairman of the Independent Press Standards Organisation, the independent regulator of the majority of newspapers and magazines in the UK.

In July 2020, Faulks was appointed chairman of the Independent Review of Administrative Law. The panel submitted its report in January 2021.

Other activities
Faulks is a contributing editor to Local Authority Liabilities, 1998, 4th edition 2009. He is on the board of the social enterprise Liberty Kitchen, set up to reduce recidivism at Pentonville Prison.

Personal life
Lord Faulks married Catherine Frances Turner, daughter of Lindsay Turner and Anthea Cadbury, in 1990. They have two sons. Catherine Faulks is a Conservative councillor on Kensington and Chelsea London Borough Council.

References

External links 
 Lord Faulks – UK Parliament
 Lord Faulks – TheyWorkForYou
 Lord Edward Faulks QC – GOV.UK

1950 births
Living people
People educated at Wellington College, Berkshire
Alumni of Jesus College, Oxford
British barristers
Conservative Party (UK) life peers
Life peers created by Elizabeth II
Members of the Middle Temple
20th-century King's Counsel
21st-century King's Counsel
Government ministers of the United Kingdom
Life peers
Fellows of Jesus College, Oxford